During the 1994–95 English football season, Middlesbrough F.C. competed in the Football League First Division.

Season summary
Middlesbrough were promoted to the top flight of English football after a two-year exile by winning the Division One title under new player-manager Bryan Robson. A large part in the promotion push was played by a good loan signing in the form of Uwe Fuchs, scoring 9 goals in 13 league games. It was also Boro's last season at Ayresome Park after 92 years; they beat Luton Town 2–1 in their final game there on 30 April 1995 to seal the Division One title and the only automatic promotion place in the division that season. John Hendrie had the distinction of scoring the last goals at Ayresome Park, scoring both of Boro's goals in that game. After the season, Boro relocated to the new 30,000-seat Riverside Stadium on the banks of the River Tees.

Final league table

Results
Middlesbrough's score comes first

Legend

Football League First Division

FA Cup

League Cup

Anglo Italian Cup

Squad

Scorers
League goals only

  John Hendrie 15
  Uwe Fuchs 9
  Craig Hignett 8
  Paul Wilkinson 6
  Jamie Pollock 5

References

External links
 Squad list
 Results

Middlesbrough F.C. seasons
Middlesbrough